The men's Greco-Roman 75 kilograms is a competition featured at the 2017 World Wrestling Championships, and was held in Paris, France on 21 August 2017.

Results
Legend
F — Won by fall

Finals

Top half

Section 1

Section 2

Bottom half

Section 3

Section 4

Repechage

 Aleksandr Chekhirkin of Russia originally won the silver medal, but was disqualified after he tested positive for doping. Tamás Lőrincz was upgraded to the silver medal and Fatih Cengiz was raised to third and took the bronze medal.

References

External links
Official website

Men's Greco-Roman 75 kg